The 1974 All-SEC football team consists of American football players selected to the All-Southeastern Conference (SEC) chosen by various selectors for the 1974 NCAA Division I football season. Alabama won the conference.

Offensive selections

Receivers 

 Lee McGriff, Florida (AP-1, UPI)
 Stanley Morgan, Tennessee (UPI)
 Gene Washington, Georgia (AP-2)

Tight ends
Barry Burton, Vanderbilt (AP-1, UPI)
Richard Appleby, Georgia (AP-2)

Tackles 

 Craig Hertwig, Georgia (AP-1, UPI)
 Warren Bryant, Kentucky (AP-1, UPI)
 Chuck Fletcher, Auburn (AP-2)
 Paul Parker, Florida (AP-2)

Guards 
Gene Moshier, Vanderbilt (AP-1)
John Rogers, Alabama (AP-1)
Mickey Marvin, Tennessee (UPI)
Randy Johnson, Georgia (UPI)
Burton Lawless, Florida (AP-2)
Sam Nichols, Miss. St. (AP-2)

Centers 
 Lee Gross, Auburn (AP-1)
 Sylvester Croom, Alabama (UPI)
 Rick Nuzum, Kentucky (AP-2)

Quarterbacks 

 Rockey Felker, Miss. St. (AP-1, UPI)
 Mike Fanuzzi, Kentucky (AP-2)

Running backs 

 Sonny Collins, Kentucky (AP-1, UPI)
 Willie Shelby, Alabama (AP-2, UPI)
 Stanley Morgan, Tennessee (AP-2, UPI [as E])
Glynn Harrison, Georgia (AP-1)
Walter Packer, Miss. St. (AP-1)
Jamie O'Rourke, Vanderbilt (AP-2)
Horace King, Georgia (AP-2)

Defensive selections

Ends 
Leroy Cook, Alabama (AP-1, UPI)
Rusty Deen, Auburn (AP-1)
Preston Kendrick, Florida (UPI)
Mike DuBose, Alabama (AP-2)
David McKnight, Georgia (AP-2)

Tackles 
 Jimmy Webb, Miss. St. (AP-1, UPI)
 Ben Williams, Ole Miss (AP-2, UPI)
 Steve Cassidy, LSU (AP-1)
Robert Pullam, Tennessee (AP-2)

Linebackers 
 Ken Bernich, Auburn (AP-1, UPI)
 Woody Lowe, Alabama (AP-1, UPI)
 Ralph Ortega, Florida (AP-2, UPI)
 Glenn Cameron, Florida (AP-1)
Sylvester Boler, Georgia (AP-2)
Harvey Hull, Miss. St. (AP-2)
Tom Galbierz, Vanderbilt (AP-2)

Backs 
Mike Washington, Alabama (AP-1, UPI)
 Ricky Davis, Alabama (AP-1, UPI)
 Mike Fuller, Auburn (AP-1, UPI)
Jay Chesley, Vanderbilt (AP-1)
Randy Talbot, Florida (UPI)
Jim McKinney, Auburn (AP-2)
Mike Williams, LSU (AP-2)
Steve Curnutte, Vanderbilt (AP-2)
Wayne Fields, Florida (AP-2)

Special teams

Kicker 

 Mark Adams, Vanderbilt (AP-1)
Allan Leavitt, Georgia (AP-2)

Punter 

 Neil Clabo, Tennessee (AP-1)
John Tatterson, Kentucky (AP-2)

Key

AP = Associated Press.

UPI = United Press International

Bold = Consensus first-team selection by both AP and UPI

See also
1974 College Football All-America Team

References

All-SEC
All-SEC football teams